"Then" is a song recorded by English singer Anne-Marie. It was released on 15 December 2017 as the fourth single from her debut studio album, Speak Your Mind (2018).

Composition
"Then" is in the key of D minor, and moves at a tempo of 113 beats per minute in a 4/4 time signature. It is described as a mid-tempo song in which Anne-Marie "nostalgically evokes her different love stories, tirelessly repeating 'I loved you' by talking about her ex-girlfriends." The song has been compared to Vaults' song "One Last Night" due to the string plucking in the song's instrumentation.

Critical reception
Mike Wass of Idolator called the song "an emotional banger" and "[Anne-Marie's] best song of the year".

Track listing
Digital download
 "Then" – 3:34

Personnel
Adapted from Tidal.
 Anne-Marie Nicholson – songwriting, vocals
 Ina Wroldsen – songwriting
 Steve Mac – songwriting, production, keyboard
 Stuart Hawkes – master engineering
 Dann Pursey – engineering
 Chris Laws – engineering, drums
 Michael Freeman – mix engineering assistance
 John Paricelli – guitar
 Mark "Spike" Stent – mixing

Charts

Certifications

Release history

References

Anne-Marie (singer) songs
2017 singles
Songs written by Steve Mac
Songs written by Ina Wroldsen
2017 songs
Songs written by Anne-Marie (singer)
Song recordings produced by Steve Mac